The Mexico national under-18 football team, is controlled by the Federación Mexicana de Fútbol Asociación (Mexican Football Federation) and represents Mexico in international under-18 (under age 18) football competitions.

The Mexico national Under-18 football team serves as a transition for players between the Mexico national under-17 football team and the Mexico national under-20 football team.

Though the team does not compete in a World Cups, It competes in international tournaments and holds several domestic training camps throughout the year.

Schedule and results

See also
 Mexico national football team
 Mexico national under-15 football team
 Mexico national under-17 football team
 Mexico national under-20 football team
 Mexico national under-21 football team
 Mexico national under-23 football team
 Mexico national beach football team
 Mexico national futsal team

References 

http://miseleccion.mx/la-seleccion-nacional-de-mexico-sub18-inicio-concentracion/

Football